This list of episodes of Conan details information on the 2016 episodes of Conan, a television program on TBS hosted by Conan O'Brien.

2016

January

February

March

April

May

June

July

August

September

October

November

December

References

Episodes (2016)
Lists of variety television series episodes
2016-related lists